Darvar-e Fartaq (also Romanized as Darvār-e Fārtaq; also known as Darvār) is a village in Bahmayi-ye Sarhadi-ye Sharqi Rural District, Dishmok District, Kohgiluyeh County, Kohgiluyeh and Boyer-Ahmad Province, Iran. At the 2006 census, its population was 255, in 45 families.

References 

Populated places in Kohgiluyeh County